Dorothea of Brunswick-Lüneburg (1 January 1570 – 15 August 1649) was a daughter of Duke William "the younger" of Brunswick-Lüneburg and his wife, Dorothea of Denmark, Duchess of Brunswick-Lüneburg.

She married Count Palatine Charles I of Zweibrücken-Birkenfeld.  They had four children:
 George William (1591–1669), Count Palatine and Duke of Zweibrücken-Birkenfeld
 Sophia (1593–1676), married Kraft VII of Hohenlohe-Neuenstein-Weikersheim (1582–1641)
 Frederick (1594–1626), canon at Strasbourg
 Christian I (1598–1654), Count Palatine and Duke of Birkenfeld-Bischweiler

References

House of Welf
Countesses Palatine of Zweibrücken
1570 births
1649 deaths
16th-century German people
17th-century German people
Daughters of monarchs